Randall's frogfish (Antennarius randalli) is a  marine fish belonging to the family Antennariidae, the frogfishes.

Description
Randall's frogfish has long, claw-like pectoral fins that it uses for stabilization. The colors range from black to white and yellow to brown. Unlike other frogfish, it has small white spots on its body. It often hides under rocks or among sea weed to ambush its prey.

Range
Randall's frogfish is known from Easter Island

References

External links
http://www.lembehresort.com/randall_s_frogfish_antennarius_randalli_c73.html
http://www.frogfish.ch/species-arten/Antennarius-randalli.html
http://www.fishbase.org/summary/Antennarius-randalli.html
 

Antennariidae
Fish described in 1970
Fauna of Easter Island